Indira Gandhi Stadium (formerly Municipal Stadium) is located in Vijayawada city of the Indian state of Andhra Pradesh. The stadium has hosted a solitary ODI between India and West Indies on Sunday, 24 November 2002. It also hosted a WODI in December 1997 between England women and Pakistan women, which was won by England by 230 runs.

National festivals like Independence Day, Republic Day and other cultural programmes have been held here after the state's bifurcation in June, 2014.

List of centuries

Key
 * denotes that the batsman was not out.
 Inns. denotes the number of the innings in the match.
 Balls denotes the number of balls faced in an innings.
 NR denotes that the number of balls was not recorded.
 Parentheses next to the player's score denotes his century number at Edgbaston.
 The column title Date refers to the date the match started.
 The column title Result refers to the player's team result

One Day Internationals

References

External links 
 Cricinfo website – ground page
 Cricketarchive

Cricket grounds in Andhra Pradesh
Sport in Vijayawada
Buildings and structures in Vijayawada
Monuments and memorials to Indira Gandhi
Buildings and structures completed in 1969
1969 establishments in Andhra Pradesh
20th-century architecture in India